Elétrica (Portuguese for "Electric") is the first live album (fifth overall) by Brazilian singer-songwriter Daniela Mercury, released in October 1998 through Epic Records (her last with that label). It was certified Platinum in Brazil for over 400,000 copies sold. The album were recorded during a concert on August 22, 1998, on Solar do Unhão, in Salvador. Parte dos direitos autorais do álbum foram doados à UNICEF.

Track listing

Chart performance

Certification and sales

References

1998 albums
Daniela Mercury albums